Father José Bernardo Sánchez (September 7, 1778 – January 15, 1833) was a Spanish missionary in colonial Mexico and Alta California.

Early life
Born in Robledillo de Mohernando, Old Castile, Spain, Sánchez became a Franciscan on October 9, 1794. In 1803 he joined the missionary College of San Fernando de Mexico in the Viceroyalty of New Spain (colonial México).

California Missions

He traveled on to Las Californias the next year, 1804, where he worked at the following missions:

 Mission San Diego de Alcalá (1804–1820)
 Mission La Purísima Concepción (1820–1821) 
 Mission San Gabriel Arcángel (1821–1827)

In 1806, as chaplain, Father Sánchez accompanied a military expedition against the Californian indigenous peoples. In 1821, with "Father-Prefect" Mariano Payeras he went with an exploring expedition into the interior of Alta California to search for new mission sites.

During the winter of 1826-1827, as head of the San Gabriel mission, Sánchez hosted the party of explorer Jedediah Smith, the first ever to travel overland to California from the United States. Most of the group stayed at San Gabriel while Smith traveled to San Diego to report to Jefe Político (governor) José María Echeandía.

From 1827 to 1831 Father Sánchez reluctantly held the position of Presidente of the California mission chain and of Vicáreo Foraneo (archbishop) to the bishop. He was a very pious and energetic missionary, but dreaded the office of superior. His incessant appeals for relief were at last granted, but he survived only two years.

Opposed secularization
During his term he vigorously opposed the Mexican government's secularization scheme, which was strongly supported by Governor Echeandia. In a long series of critical notes he claimed that the plan would result in the destruction of the missions and the ruin of the neophytes. "As far as it concerns me personally," he wrote, "...would that it might be tomorrow, so that I might retire between the four walls of a cell to weep over the time I wasted in behalf of these unfortunates." It has been said that the sight of the inevitable ruin hastened his death. His remains were buried at the foot of the altar of San Gabriel Mission.

References 

Priests of the Spanish missions in California
1778 births
1833 deaths
People of the Californias
People of Mexican California
Spanish Franciscans
Spanish military chaplains
Spanish Roman Catholic missionaries
People from the Province of Guadalajara
19th century in Los Angeles
Roman Catholic missionaries in Mexico
Roman Catholic missionaries in New Spain
19th-century Spanish military personnel